St Lawrence Academy or Saint Lawrence Academy may refer to:

 Saint Lawrence Academy (Santa Clara), a Catholic college preparatory school located in California, United States
 St Lawrence Academy (Scunthorpe), a Church of England secondary school located in Lincolnshire, England

See also
 Saint Lawrence (disambiguation)
 Catholic University School (formerly St Lawrence's Academy)